"She's Comin' to Say Goodbye" is a song co-written and recorded by American country music artist Eddie Rabbitt.  It was released in July 1985 as the fourth single from the album The Best Year of My Life.  The song reached number 6 on the Billboard Hot Country Singles & Tracks chart.  It was written by Rabbitt and Even Stevens.

Chart performance

References

1985 singles
1984 songs
Eddie Rabbitt songs
Songs written by Eddie Rabbitt
Song recordings produced by Jimmy Bowen
Warner Records singles
Songs written by Even Stevens (songwriter)